The Court of the Patriarchs' is a sandstone cliff on the south face of the Three Patriarchs in Zion Canyon in  Zion National Park in Washington County, Utah, United States.

Climate
Spring and fall are the most favorable seasons to visit Court of the Patriarchs. According to the Köppen climate classification system, it is located in a cold semi-arid climate zone, which is defined by the coldest month having an average mean temperature below 32 °F (0 °C), and at least 50% of the total annual precipitation being received during the spring and summer.

Gallery

See also
 Geology of the Zion and Kolob canyons area

References

External links

Landforms of Washington County, Utah
Landmarks in Utah
Rock formations of Utah
Zion National Park